The MERALCO Power Spikers were a women's volleyball team playing in the Shakey's V-League and the Philippine Superliga. The team debuted in 2013 in the Shakey's V-League. The team is owned by the Manila Electric Company (MERALCO).

Team colors

Current roster

Shakey's V-League
For the Shakey's V-League 12th Season Open Conference: 

Coaching staff
 Head coach: Brian Esquibel 
 Assistant coach(s): Renz Mauro Ordoñez

Team Staff
 Team Manager: Ferdinand Geluz
 Team Utility: Randy Fallorina Melvin Carolino

Medical Staff
 Team Physician:
 Physical Therapist:

Philippine Superliga
For the 2015 PSL Grand Prix Conference:

Coaching staff
 Head coach: Ramil de Jesus
 Assistant coach(s): Noel Orcullo Benson Bocboc Brian Esquibel

Team Staff
 Team Manager: Ferdinand Geluz
 Team Utility: 

Medical Staff
 Team Physician: Grace Salimbao
 Physical Therapist: Carissa Gotis

For the 2015 PSL Beach Volleyball Challenge Cup:

Coaching staff
 Head coach: Emil Lontoc
 Assistant coach(s):

Team Staff
 Team Manager:
 Team Utility: 

Medical Staff
 Team Physician:
 Physical Therapist:

Honors

Team

Premier Volleyball League

Philippine Superliga

MVP Olympics

Individual

Shakey's V-League

Team captains

Shakey's V-League

Philippine Superliga

See also
 MERALCO Bolts
 MERALCO Manila
 MERALCO Reddy Kilowatts

References

External links
 One Meralco Sports (official website)
 www.v-league.ph

Women's volleyball teams in the Philippines
M
Philippine Super Liga
Volleyball clubs established in 2013
2013 establishments in the Philippines